The Syracuse Salty Dogs (formally Syracuse Football Club) were a professional men's soccer team based in Syracuse, New York. The name of the club originates from "Salty Dog" which is nautical slang for an experienced sailor who has spent much of his life aboard a ship at sea and thus generally given increased credibility by ship mates in matters pertaining to ship-board life and duties. The club was a member of the USL A-League, playing only two seasons from 2003–2004. The club was owned and operated by the Syracuse Pro Sports Group and played most home games at P&C Stadium. The team suspended operations in October 2004 due to financial difficulties and has not played since. However, groups have been working to return pro soccer to Syracuse.

History
The Salty Dogs debuted in their first season in 2003, where they ended with a record of 11–12–5 (W–L–D) under coach Laurie Calloway. The club improved their record to 15–8–5 in their second season and averaged the third highest attendance in the A-League during both years of play.

Financial difficulties & dissolution
Despite high attendance in the A-League over both years of play and reasonable success on the field, the team faltered financially. The club's budget had been strained as a result of using P&C Stadium (now known as NBT Bank Stadium), which is run by the SkyChiefs. During their first season, the team was forced to play several home games at the Liverpool Athletic Complex at Liverpool High School, which was primarily a football field in Liverpool, NY (also shared by the CNY Express, an amateur American football team). During its second season, the team's playoff home games were in Cortland, NY for similar reasons.

During the 2004 season, there were proposals to build a downtown soccer stadium near Armory Square. After the team's folding, Matt Driscoll, Syracuse's mayor, stated that realization of such a stadium is only feasible if a team returns. The Syracuse Pro Sports group filed for bankruptcy and folded the team in October 2004.

Future soccer expansion in Syracuse
The Syracuse-based Monolith Athletic Club had been working to return professional soccer to Syracuse. After over a year of negotiations, the group has cleared two out of the four hurdles necessary to bring USL soccer back to Syracuse. The second hurdle, seen as the pivotal one, involving the Chiefs baseball team, was cleared in April 2006. The final two steps involved a settlement on territorial rights with the Rochester Raging Rhinos and expansion approval from the USL.

In September 2007, Matt Michael of the Syracuse Post-Standard reported that Monolith Athletic Club owner, Vito William Lucchetti, was no longer involved with bringing pro soccer to Syracuse, citing his intent to focus on his other business dealings.

Professional soccer did return to Syracuse in 2011 when the expansion Syracuse Silver Knights began play in the Major Indoor Soccer League.

Players

2004 Roster
Salty Dogs roster for their final 2004 season.

Coach
  Laurie Calloway 2003–2004

Year-by-year

Player statistics
2003

2004

See also
 Rochester Rhinos
 New York Red Bulls

References

  Michael, Matthew: "It's a Deal: Pro Soccer", Post-Standard, 20 April 2006
  Michael, Matthew: "What's next: Making a deal with Rochester's Raging Rhinos", Post-Standard, 20 April 2006

Defunct soccer clubs in New York (state)
Soccer in Syracuse, New York
Men's soccer clubs in New York (state)
A-League (1995–2004) teams
2003 establishments in New York (state)
2004 disestablishments in New York (state)
Association football clubs established in 2003
Association football clubs disestablished in 2004